The Historical Sexual Offences (Pardons and Disregards) (Scotland) Act 2018 is an Act of the Scottish Parliament. It retroactively pardons men convicted of sexual offences under obsolete sodomy laws now repealed in Scotland. It came into effect in 2019. Men convicted of these historical offences will now receive an automatic formal pardon on application.

References

External links 
 http://www.legislation.gov.uk/asp/2018/14/contents/enacted

2018 in British law
Acts of the Scottish Parliament 2018
LGBT law in the United Kingdom
2018 in LGBT history
2019 in LGBT history